There are two species of skink named rusty skink:

 Madascincus macrolepis, endemic to Madagascar
 Eremiascincus rubiginosus, found in Western Australia

Reptile common names